Latiphea berresoides is a moth of the family Noctuidae first described by George Hampson in 1893. It is found in India and Sri Lanka.

References

Moths of Asia
Moths described in 1893
Herminiinae